A chancellor is a leader of a college or university, usually either the executive or ceremonial head of the university or of a university campus within a university system.

In most Commonwealth and former Commonwealth nations, the chancellor is usually a ceremonial non-resident head of the university. In such institutions, the chief executive of a university is the vice-chancellor, who may carry an additional title such as president (e.g. "president & vice-chancellor"). The chancellor may serve as chairperson of the governing body; if not, this duty is often held by a chairperson who may be known as a pro-chancellor.

In many countries, the administrative and educational head of the university is known as the president, principal or rector. In the United States, the head of a university is most commonly a university president. In U.S., university systems that have more than one affiliated university or campus, the executive head of a specific campus may have the title of chancellor and report to the overall system's president, or vice versa.

Chancellor

Australia and New Zealand
In both Australia and New Zealand, a chancellor is the chairperson of a university's governing body; thus, as well as having ceremonial duties, the chancellor participates in the governance of the university (but not its active management). The chancellor is assisted by a deputy chancellor (known as the pro-chancellor in some universities). The chancellor and deputy chancellor are frequently drawn from the senior ranks of business or the judiciary (it is one of the few jobs considered compatible with judicial service). Some universities have a visitor who is senior to the chancellor. University disputes can be appealed from the governing board to the visitor (as is still the case in the UK), but nowadays, such appeals are generally prohibited by legislation, and the position has only ceremonial functions (unlike the chancellor and deputy chancellor, who frequently preside at functions such as graduations, the visitor rarely attends university functions). The vice-chancellor usually serves as the chief executive of the university.

Macquarie University in Sydney is a noteworthy anomaly as it once had the unique position of Emeritus Deputy Chancellor, a post created for John Lincoln upon his retirement from his long-held post of deputy chancellor in 2000. The position was not merely an honorary title, as it also retained for Lincoln a place in the University Council until his death in 2011.

Bangladesh
Chancellor is a titular position in Bangladesh always held by the incumbent President of Bangladesh under the Private Universities Act 1992. The position in public universities is not fixed for the president under any acts or laws (since the erection of a state university in Bangladesh requires an act to be passed in itself), but it has been the custom so far to name the incumbent president of the country as chancellor of all state universities thus established. The day-to-day business of the university is run by the vice chancellor. The vice chancellor has a deputy called the pro-vice-chancellor.

Canada

Canadian universities have a titular chancellor similar to those in England and Wales, with day-to-day operations typically handled by a principal. The vice-chancellor usually carries the joint title of "president and vice-chancellor" or "rector and vice-chancellor."

Finland
In Finland, if the university has a chancellor (Finnish: Kansleri, Swedish: Kansler), they are the leading official in the university. The duties of the chancellor are mainly to promote sciences and to look after the best interests of the university. As the rector of the university (Finnish: rehtori, Swedish: rektor) remains the de facto administrative leader and chief executive official, the role of the chancellor is more of a social, political and even historical nature. However some administrative duties still belong to the chancellor's jurisdiction despite their often arguably ceremonial nature. Examples of these include the appointment of new professors and docents.

The chancellor of University of Helsinki (the oldest, largest and most prestigious in Finland) has also the notable right to be present and to speak in the plenary meetings of the Council of State when matters regarding the university are discussed. Despite their role as the chancellor of only one university, they are often regarded as the political representative of Finland's entire university institution when they exercise their rights in the Council of State.

In the history of Finland the office of the chancellor dates all the way back to the Swedish Empire, and later the Russian Empire. Historically the chancellor's duty was to function as the official representative of the monarch in the autonomous university.

The number of chancellors in Finnish universities has declined over the years, and in the vast majority of Finnish universities the highest official is the rector. The remaining universities with chancellors are University of Helsinki and Åbo Akademi University.

France
In France, chancellor is one of the titles of the rector, a senior civil servant of the Ministry of Education serving as manager of a regional educational district. In his capacity as chancellor, the rector awards academic degrees to the university's graduates, oversees the legality of the universities' executive acts and channels funding from the ministry. The rector has no executive function in any university but remains a member ex officio of the board of every public university in his district.

Germany and Poland
In Poland, the chancellor (kanclerz) is the head of many universities' administration and the leader of the non-academic staff while the rector is the academic head. The main academic bodies of the university consists of: rektor (the head of the university), prorector (deputy rektor), dziekan (the head of the faculty), prodziekan (deputy dziekan), senat (the main council of the university). In universities with presidential constitution, the university's president holds both the functions of chancellor and rector.
Similarly, in Germany the chancellor (Kanzler) is the head of the administration, and regularly is recruited not from a scholarly but from an administrative background. The chancellor is a member of the governing body of the university (Hochschulleitung), which is directed by either a rector (Rektor) or a president (Präsident), whose precise role may vary among universities. Traditionally, the chancellor had the role to represent the local king or later the government in the university and to make sure that the university is compliant with government laws and policies. After universities gained more autonomy in the 20th century, they also got more freedom in choosing the chancellor by themselves. However, still today the chancellor is not an administrator who is entirely subordinate to the president but an office holder who oversees a host of responsibilities assigned to him or her directly by higher education law. This can give the chancellor a considerable veto power in the university leadership.

Hong Kong
In Hong Kong, the Chief Executive of Hong Kong (and before 1997, Governor of Hong Kong) acts as the chancellor of all chartered universities, which includes all eight public universities and Hong Kong Metropolitan University. Day-to-day operation is in the hands of either a vice-chancellor (older and established institutions) or a president (in newer institutions), depending on the institution.

Kazakhstan, Turkey, Russia, and Ukraine
In Kazakhstan, Turkey, Russia, and Ukraine, the chancellor is the head of the university and is called a "rector." Some universities in Russia and Ukraine have figurehead "presidents."

India
In India, almost all universities have a chancellor as their titular head whose function is largely ceremonial. The governor of the state, appointed as the union's representative of state by the president, is the honorary chancellor of all State owned universities. The de facto head of any government university is the vice-chancellor. In private non-profit universities, normally the head of the foundation who has established the university is the chancellor of the university and is the head of the university.

For private university unlike the chancellor who heads the conventional Indian 'state university', the private university is headed by a president or chairman of private organization and have other posts like vice-chancellors, deans of faculties, registrar and controller of examinations.

Ireland
In Ireland, the four universities all have a chancellor as their figurehead leader. However, the day-to-day operations of the universities are under the directorship of a president (a provost in the case of Trinity College Dublin). The National University of Ireland's constituent universities do not have a chancellor each; rather, the president of each constituent university has the title of Pro-Vice-Chancellor of the NUI. In Dublin City University and the University of Limerick, the chancellor is also the chairman of the university's governing authority.

Malaysia
In Malaysia, the chancellor position is given to dignitaries such as royalty or prominent politicians by universities to represent the universities in the political arena. For example, the chancellor of University of Malaya, the oldest university in Malaysia is Sultan Nazrin Shah, the Sultan of Perak. His father, Sultan Azlan Shah also served as chancellor at the same university until his death in 2014.

The chancellor of Universiti Putra Malaysia is the current Sultan of Selangor, Sultan Sharafuddin Idris Shah, while the current Yang di-Pertuan Besar of Negeri Sembilan, Tunku Muhriz is the chancellor of Universiti Kebangsaan Malaysia.

The chancellor of Universiti Tun Hussein Onn Malaysia, a university situated in the state of Johor, is the current Sultan of Johor, Sultan Ibrahim.

Datin Seri Jeanne Abdullah, the wife of the former Prime Minister of Malaysia, Datuk Seri Abdullah Ahmad Badawi was appointed as the new chancellor of Open University Malaysia to take over the role from the first chancellor, the late YBhg Datin Paduka Seri Endon Mahmood (Abdullah Badawi's first wife).

Recently, UCSI in Kuala Lumpur has given recognition to Tan Sri Datuk Seri Panglima Dr. Abdul Rahman Arshad as its first chancellor.

Nepal
In Nepal, universities have a chancellor as ceremonial head. The de facto head of the university is the vice-chancellor. The chancellor is primarily responsible for attending the convocation programmes and accepting the resignation and appointment letter of a new vice-chancellor. Generally, the prime minister is considered the chancellor, and in his absence, the minister of education acts as the chancellor.

Pakistan
In Pakistan, chancellor is normally the figurehead of the university, who is normally the provincial governor where that university exists.
Day-to-day business of the university is run by the vice chancellor.

Philippines
In the Philippines, the De La Salle University designates the head of its university as the chancellor. For the University of the Philippines, the entire system is headed by a president, while the eight constituent universities under the system is each headed by a chancellor. The chancellor designates the different vice-chancellors for different areas of concern of the university: academic affairs, finance, and community affairs, among others. Some more universities like University of Santo Tomas and other colleges, institutions have chancellors. Its chancellor is the incumbent Master of the Order of Preachers (Dominicans); meanwhile, the vice chancellor is the prior provincial of the Dominican Province of the Philippines. Their roles are largely ceremonial. The University of Santo Tomas is governed mainly by its rector magnificus in overseeing its academic, financial and other affairs. On the other hand, the San Beda System has the prior or the abbot of Our Lady of Montserrat Abbey (Manila) as its chancellor for its constituent units while a rector-president heads each constituent unit.

Other universities in the Philippines (such as state universities like Mindanao State University where each constituent campus is headed by chancellor) are mostly headed by their respective university presidents. Meanwhile, private (esp. Catholic) institutions are headed by a rector.

United Kingdom

In the United Kingdom, a Chancellor is generally a titular position without day-to-day managerial responsibilities, such as at University of Oxford, where the Vice-Chancellor runs the administration and is the de facto university leader. In Scotland, day-to-day operations are typically handled by a "principal and vice-chancellor."

The chancellor of the University of Edinburgh is Anne, Princess Royal, whilst the current chancellor of the University of Aberdeen is Camilla, Queen Consort of The United Kingdom.

United States

In the United States, heads of colleges and universities are typically called "president." A multi-campus university system may be headed by a chancellor who serves as systemwide chief, with presidents governing individual institutions. This is more commonly seen in university systems which were belatedly formed by grouping together already-extant colleges or universities in the 20th century, such as the State University of New York, the City University of New York, and the California State University. In many state university systems which began with a single flagship campus in the 18th or 19th century and gradually delegated operational authority to satellite campuses during the 20th century, the titles are reversed. This is the case in Arkansas, California, North Carolina, Illinois, Massachusetts, Missouri, and Wisconsin.

Outside of university systems, presidents are the functional chief executive officers of most standalone U.S. universities. However, a few universities, such as Syracuse University and the University of Pittsburgh, have a chancellor as their chief executive officer. There are occasional other uses of the title "chancellor." The College of William & Mary uses the term "chancellor" in the British sense, as a figurehead leader, but the actual executive of the school is the "president," not a "vice-chancellor." Some schools, such as Lubbock Christian University, give the ceremonial title of "chancellor" to a retiring university president. The Catholic University of America is headed by a president (formerly "rector"), with the Archbishop of Washington serving as chancellor, a ceremonial position but one which does require the archbishop to represent the university before the Holy See. This scenario, while not always exactly duplicated, is typical in other Catholic universities due to the Catholic hierarchy. In some schools run by Catholic religious orders, the rector of the community supersedes the president when the latter is a member of that religious order. In some universities, such as Massachusetts Institute of Technology, the chancellor is a high-ranking officer below the president and equal to or below the provost, who might have vice-chancellors reporting to her or him.

The title "chancellor" is sometimes used in K-12 education in a sense similar to superintendent of schools, particularly in urban school districts. The New York City Schools Chancellor is the chief executive officer of the New York City Department of Education, which manages the city's public school system (the largest in the United States). The leader of the District of Columbia Public Schools system is also referred to as the chancellor.

University president

University president is the title of the highest-ranking officer within the academic administration of a university, within university systems that prefer that appellation over other variations such as chancellor or rector. The relative seniority varies between institutions.

France
In France, the president is the elected chair of the board and chief executive officer in universities. The president is always elected by the board among the professors of the university. The president serves a four-year term which is renewable once. The chancellor is a servant of the Ministry of Education who supervises regional educational districts. There is no hierarchical relation between the president and the chancellor.

United Kingdom
In Northern Ireland, the president is the chief academic and administrative officer of the university and is usually also the vice-chancellor of the university. The private London-based liberal-arts university Richmond, The American International University in London utilises the same system as in the United States but also with a ceremonial chancellor as figurehead.

United States
In most stand-alone universities and colleges in the United States, the chief executive officer is called the president, while the second-most senior officer is called the provost, vice president of academic affairs, dean of faculties, or some other similar title.

In the United States, the executive and ceremonial roles are not split, which means that a university president assumes an enormous burden in terms of the sheer breadth of their duties and responsibilities. The president is expected to preside over all major ceremonies, including graduations and presentations of awards and honors, while also reporting to the board of trustees and personally handling certain high-level executive functions: external relations (especially public relations and fundraising) and long-range planning and strategy (especially the creation and termination of university degrees, programs, and policies). Most other decisions are delegated to their second in command, especially operational day-to-day decisions. The provost often has the final say on resource allocation decisions, difficult tenure decisions, whether to initiate recruiting of star faculty from other institutions, and whether to initiate defensive measures against such recruiting of the institution's own star faculty.

University presidents typically ascend to the position from academic careers (i.e., after earning tenure and becoming professors and then deans), and it is highly unusual for a university to recruit a president who lacks a strong track record in academic research or university administration.

The average salary for college presidents in private, non-profit institutions in 2015 was $569,932, 9 percent higher than in 2014.

Vice-chancellor

A "vice-chancellor" (commonly called a "VC") serves as the chief executive of a university in England, Wales, Northern Ireland, New Zealand, Australia, Nepal, India, Bangladesh, Malaysia, Nigeria, Pakistan, Sri Lanka, South Africa, Kenya, other Commonwealth countries, and some universities in Hong Kong. In Scotland, Canada, and Ireland, the chief executive of a university is usually called principal or president, with vice-chancellor being an honorific associated with this title, allowing the individual to bestow degrees in absence of the chancellor.

The role of the VC contrasts with that of the chancellor, who is usually a prominent public figure who acts as a ceremonial figurehead only (e.g., the chancellor of the University of Cambridge for 36 years was Prince Philip), while the vice-chancellor is the chief executive. An assistant to a vice-chancellor is called a pro-vice-chancellor or deputy vice-chancellor; these were traditionally academics who were elected to take on additional responsibilities in addition to their regular teaching and research for a limited time, but are now increasingly commonly full-time appointments. In some universities (e.g. in Australian universities: Deakin University, Macquarie University), there are several deputy vice-chancellors subordinate to the vice-chancellor, with pro-vice-chancellor being a position at executive level ranking below deputy vice-chancellor.

There are a few exceptions within England. For example, the charter of the University of Manchester provides for the vice-chancellor to also use the title president, and the first vice-chancellor, Alan Gilbert (2004–10), used president as his main title. The University of Warwick now officially uses "vice-chancellor and president" (VCP), although the holder is usually still known as the vice-chancellor in all but official documents. The chief executives of the constituent colleges of the University of London, many of which are now functionally independent universities, generally use the title principal, although the chief executive of Imperial College has the title rector, University College London's chief executive is the "president and provost", the London School of Economics' head is titled director and Birkbeck College is headed by the master.

Australia
The executive head of an Australian university is the vice-chancellor, who serves as the university equivalent of a chief executive officer. The vice-chancellor is responsible for the day-to-day operations of the university and reports directly to the University Council, which the chancellor heads. Assisting the vice-chancellor, the roles of deputy vice-chancellors and pro vice-chancellors have emerged to better manage the administrative overhead of the position.

Canada and Scotland

Canadian university vice-chancellors almost always carry the title of "president (or equivalent) and vice-chancellor"; likewise, in Scotland, they hold the position of "principal and vice-chancellor" (as do a few Canadian universities such as Queen's and McGill). In the Scottish practice, the one individual may have two sets of official robes, reflecting a continuing division of responsibilities between the two posts. The vice-chancellor's robes, therefore, should not be worn in the presence of the chancellor but should only be worn when deputizing for the chancellor.

India
In India, most central and state level universities have a titular head called chancellor who is either an eminent person appointed by the Government of India (in central universities) or provincial governor (in state universities). The  head of a university is the vice-chancellor, the highest paid official of the university. Next in command are more than one pro-vice-chancellor in charge of academic as well as administrative and financial affairs. In deemed universities and institutes of national importance, the head of the institution is either called director general or director, the latter designation being more commonly used in academic terms in the subcontinent.

Bangladesh
The President of Bangladesh is the titular chancellor of all universities in Bangladesh, public or private. The vice chancellor is the executive head, and his deputy, the pro-vice chancellor holds a full-time administrative office.

Nepal
The Prime Minister of Nepal is the titular chancellor of most universities in Nepal, public or private. The vice chancellor is the executive head, and along with Registrar holds a full-time administrative office.

Sri Lanka
In Sri Lanka, all the government universities are administered by the vice-chancellor.

Sudan
In Sudan and South Sudan, universities are administered by the vice-chancellor.

Kenya
In Kenya, chancellors are titular heads of public universities, either appointed by the head of state (president) directly, or, in newly introduced legislation, at the recommendation of senate and alumni of the university. The day-to-day running of universities is the responsibility of the vice-chancellors. "Rector" and "president" are not commonly used terms in university administration.
The vice-chancellor is assisted by a number of high ranking University officials known as Deputy Vice-chancellor, popularly referred to as DVC. The DVC's head specific departments of the university such as Finance and Administration, etc.

Malaysia 

In Malaysia, all the government universities are administered by the vice-chancellor.

Nigeria 
In Nigeria, chancellors are ceremonial heads of public universities (mostly traditional monarchs), appointed by the head of state (president), governor of a state (in the case of state-owned universities) or assumed by the owner of a private university. The day-to-day running of universities is the responsibility of the vice-chancellors. There are also pro-chancellors who are government appointees that head the universities' governing councils. The university governing council is the highest administrative organ of a Nigerian public universities. They approve projects, contracts, recruitments, promotions and are regarded as employer of university workers. They also appoint the principal officers of the university including the vice chancellor. They exercise all these functions on behalf of the "visitor." The visitor is the president of the federation (for federal universities) and state governors for state-owned universities.

Ireland
In Ireland, day-to-day operations of the universities are under the directorship of a president (a provost in the case of Trinity College Dublin). However, the president of each constituent university of the National University of Ireland also has the title of pro-vice-chancellor of the NUI.

Philippines
In the Philippines, University of Santo Tomas the day-to-day head of the university, as mandated by their duty as the Prior Provincial of the Philippine Dominican Province, the Dominican province that has majority control over the university.

As said earlier, the vice-chancellor or the "grand vice-chancellor of the University of Santo Tomas" is only the deputy to the chancellor of the university, but the chancellor is usually a prominent public figure who is not always in the country (e.g., the chancellor of University of Santo Tomas is the current Master of the Order of Preachers, the current being Very Rev. Fr. Bruno Cadoré, OP, while the rector acts as the day-to-day chief executive). The current vice chancellor of UST is the Prior Provincial of the Philippine Dominican Province, Very Rev. Fr. Napoleon Sipalay, OP. The current rector of the university is Rev. Fr. Herminio V. Dagohoy, OP.

In the University of the Philippines, the chancellor assigns different vice-chancellors to handle different aspects of running the university. There is one for instruction, administration, and community affairs, among others.

Sweden
In Sweden, the rektor (rector) is the head of a Swedish university, but the word vice-chancellor (vicekansler) is often used as the English translation of rektor. The vice-chancellor (vicekansler) is also an honorary title given to the rectores magnifici at the universities of Lund and Uppsala.

University chancellor (universitetskansler) is the office of the highest civil servant in the Swedish university system.

United States
In the United States, a vice chancellor (typically spelled without a hyphen) is an assistant to a chancellor, who is generally the (actual, not merely ceremonial) head of one campus of a large university which has several campuses. The head of the entire university is the president (the equivalent of a Commonwealth vice-chancellor), the chancellor is in charge of one campus, and a vice chancellor is one of their direct reports responsible for a broad area of authority at one campus. Some systems, such as the California State University and the Pennsylvania State System of Higher Education invert this arrangement so that the chancellor is the head of the entire university system, while a vice chancellor is an executive who directly reports to the chancellor and is responsible for a broad area of authority across the entire system.

At the University of the South, the vice chancellor is the administrative head of the university (as well as mayor of the town of Sewanee). The chancellor is a bishop of one of the 28 southeastern Episcopal dioceses that own the university and is elected by the members of the board of trustees. The chancellor neither resides at the university nor holds administrative power; the office of chancellor is a ceremonial one.

Principal
The principal is the chief executive and the chief academic officer of a university or college in certain parts of the Commonwealth.

A "director" is the chief executive officer of a university or other educational institution. Equivalent names in different countries are vice-chancellor (many Commonwealth countries), chancellor (United States), principal (Scotland and Canada), and university president.

United Kingdom

In Scotland, the principal is appointed by the university court or governing body of the university and will be chairman or president of the body of academics. In the case of the ancient universities of Scotland, the principal is president of the academic senate. The principal also holds the title of vice-chancellor, but their powers with regard to this position extend only to the awarding of degrees, as both the vice-chancellor and chancellor are titular posts.

Canada
Queen's University and McGill University in Canada have principals instead of presidents as a result of their Scottish origins. In addition, the Royal Military College of Canada also has a principal.

South Africa

In South Africa, the Higher Education Act 101 of 1997 defines the principal as "the chief executive and accounting officer of a public higher education institution." The definition allows for the alternative nomenclatures of vice-chancellor and a rector, and these terms are in widespread use (the term vice-chancellor is more common in English-medium universities, whilst the term rector tends to be used in Afrikaans-medium universities). The exact name in a particular university will be defined by the Institutional Statute. The same act defines the chancellor as the titular head of an institution.

See also
 Pro-chancellor
 Academic administration
 Lists of university leaders
 Administrators: trustee, president, vice president, university principal, dean, provost, rector
 Other: college, faculty, professor

References

Academic honours
 
Education and training occupations
University governance
 
Academic administration